William, later called William the Trouvère, was an English poet. He translated tales from the Latin Miracles of the Virgin into Anglo-Norman verse.

Works 
William was first called Adgar but became more commonly known as William. Working at the instance of one Gregory, his friend, he translated over forty tales into octosyllabic Anglo-Norman verse, from the Latin collection of Miracles of the Virgin which he found in the almarie or bookcase of St. Paul's. His collection of some forty-nine tales, entitled Gracial, was dedicated to one Maud, "dame Mahaut", most likely the abbess of Barking who was a daughter of Henry II born out of wedlock.

See also 

 Cantigas de Santa Maria
 The Miracles of Our Lady
 Trouvère

References

Sources 

 

Attribution:

Further reading 

 Ibáñez Rodríguez, Miguel (1997–1998). «Le Gracial de Adgar y los Milagros de Nuestra Señora de Gonzalo de Berceo. Estudio comparativo». C.I.F., XXIII–XXIV. pp. 163–183.
 Kunstmann, Pierre, ed. (1982). Adgar: Le Gracial. Ottawa: Editions de l'Université d'Ottawa.
 Kuntsmann, Pierre (2017). "Adgar (The Gracial)". In Echard, Sian; Rouse, Robert (eds.). The Encyclopedia of Medieval Literature in Britain. John Wiley & Sons. pp. 238, 1292–1293. .
 Legge, Mary Dominica (1963). Anglo-Norman Literature and Its Background. Oxford: Clarendon Press. pp. 187–191.
 Mussafia, A. (1887). "Studien zu mittelalterlichen Marienlegenden". In Kaiserliche Academie der Wissenschaften, Sitzungsbericht (Phil. Hist. Classe), vol. cxiii, no. 2. Vienna. p. 917.
 Vollmöller, Karl (1883). "Die Adgarlegenden". In Romane Forschungen. Vol. 1. Erlangen: Andreas Deichert. p. 183.
 Ward, Henry Leigh Douglas (1893). Catalogue of Romances in the Department of Manuscripts in the British Museum. Vol. 2. London: Longmans & Co.; Asher & Co.; Kegan Paul, Trench, Trübner & Co.; The Oxford University Press. p. 592.
 Wright, Thomas (1846). "William the Trouvere". In Biographia Britannica Literaria. Vol. 2: Anglo-Norman Period. London: John W. Parker. pp. 464–465. 

12th-century English writers
12th-century English poets
Anglo-Norman literature